Funk, Inc. is the first studio album by Funk, Inc., released in 1971.

Track listing

Personnel
Gene Barr - Tenor saxophone
Cecil Hunt - Conga
Jimmy Munford - Drums, Vocals
Bobby Watley - Organ, Vocals
Steve Weakley - Guitar

Charts

Album

External links
 Funk,Inc - Funk,Inc at Discogs

1971 debut albums
Funk, Inc. albums
Prestige Records albums
Albums recorded at Van Gelder Studio
Albums produced by Bob Porter (record producer)